Maurício dos Santos Nascimento (born 20 September 1988), known simply as Maurício, is a Brazilian footballer who plays as a centre-back for Chapecoense.

Club career
Born in São Paulo, Mauricio emerged through Sociedade Esportiva Palmeiras's youth system, and made his professional debuts while on loan at Clube de Regatas Brasil in 2007, in Série B. He returned to Verdão in 2008, appearing in Série A for the first time.

On 18 November 2009, Maurício had an altercation with Palmeiras teammate Obina during half-time of a match against Grêmio Foot-Ball Porto Alegrense, with both being dismissed by the club a day later. He was subsequently loaned to Grêmio, Associação Portuguesa de Desportos, Esporte Clube Vitória and Joinville Esporte Clube, before being released in 2012. On 5 January 2013, he joined Sport Club do Recife.

On 4 July 2013, Maurício moved abroad for the first time, signing a five-year contract with Sporting Clube de Portugal. In his maiden appearance in Primeira Liga, on 18 August, he helped the hosts come from behind against F.C. Arouca to win it 5–1, his goal coming following a corner kick in the 30th minute.

Late into the 2015 January transfer window, Maurício was loaned to Serie A side S.S. Lazio until June, with the club agreeing to buy his sporting rights at the end of the campaign for €2.6 million. The following 29 August, already owned by the Italians, he moved on loan to Russian Premier League's FC Spartak Moscow. He was released by Lazio on 17 October 2018 and signed with Malaysia Super League club Johor Darul Ta'zim F.C. five days latter. He scored one goal against South Korea giant Suwon Samsung Bluewings at 2020 AFC Champions League with 2–1 win.

Honours
Palmeiras
Campeonato Paulista: 2008

Sporting
Taça de Portugal: 2014–15

Spartak
Russian Premier League: 2016–17

Legia Warsaw
Ekstraklasa: 2017–18
Polish Cup: 2017–18

Johor Darul Ta'zim
Malaysia Cup(1): 2019
Malaysia Super League(2): 2019, 2020,2021
Malaysia Charity Shield(3): 2019, 2020, 2021

Individual
2020 Man Of The Match Malaysia Charity Shield: 2020

References

External links
 
 
 
 

1988 births
Footballers from São Paulo (state)
Living people
Brazilian footballers
Association football defenders
Sociedade Esportiva Palmeiras players
Clube de Regatas Brasil players
Grêmio Foot-Ball Porto Alegrense players
Associação Portuguesa de Desportos players
Esporte Clube Vitória players
Joinville Esporte Clube players
Sport Club do Recife players
Sporting CP footballers
S.S. Lazio players
FC Spartak Moscow players
Legia Warsaw players
Johor Darul Ta'zim F.C. players
Clube Náutico Capibaribe players
Associação Chapecoense de Futebol players
Campeonato Brasileiro Série A players
Campeonato Brasileiro Série B players
Campeonato Catarinense players
Campeonato Pernambucano players
Primeira Liga players
Serie A players
Russian Premier League players
Ekstraklasa players
Malaysia Super League players
Brazilian expatriate footballers
Expatriate footballers in Portugal
Brazilian expatriate sportspeople in Portugal
Expatriate footballers in Italy
Brazilian expatriate sportspeople in Italy
Expatriate footballers in Russia
Brazilian expatriate sportspeople in Russia
Expatriate footballers in Poland
Brazilian expatriate sportspeople in Poland
Expatriate footballers in Malaysia
Brazilian expatriate sportspeople in Malaysia